Bon Secour  is an unincorporated community in Baldwin County, Alabama, United States. It lies along the eastern coastline of Bon Secour Bay (a contiguous bay that sits along the eastern edge of Mobile Bay). The name "Bon Secour" derives from the French phrase meaning "safe harbor" due to the secluded location on the inside coast of the Fort Morgan peninsula of southern Alabama.

Bon Secour lies on the Bon Secour River. The estuarial river system empties into Bon Secour Bay at Mobile Bay.

The estimated population of the town is 743 in 2010,
up from 302 in 2000 (see detailed Demographics below). However, since Hurricane Ivan, single-family housing developments and the population have continued to grow. It is part of the Daphne-Fairhope-Foley metropolitan area.

Bon Secour is sometimes mentioned in hurricane report statistics, for the region, since Bon Secour is the easternmost town inside the coastline of Mobile Bay when entering the bay from the south, indicating weather and tide conditions for the population at the southeast end of Mobile Bay, nearest the entrance to the Gulf of Mexico.  By contrast, Mobile, Alabama is located near the (diagonally opposite) north end of Mobile Bay, much farther from the Gulf tide and hurricane storm surges.

History 
Bon Secour has a rich history. It was originally a French fishing village settlement dating back to the late 19th century. Currently it is a waterfront community that serves as a safe harbor to a commercial fishing fleet. Named by Jacques Cook, a French Canadian from Montreal, a member of Pierre Le Moyne d'Iberville's colonizing expedition of 1699. He was a participant in the founding of Mobile in 1702. There are several major seafood industry businesses currently operating out of the Bon Secour estuary. Bon Secour Fisheries, Safe Harbor Seafood, Aquilla Seafood and Billy's Seafood all ship large quantities of Gulf of Mexico seafood to all areas of the United States. Bon Secour Fisheries is the oldest and biggest of them all, having been operating since the 1890s. The primary catch for the Bon Secour fishing fleet ranges from Mobile Bay shrimp to deep water "Royal Red" shrimp. Large shrimp boats line the shores of the Bon Secour River, docked at processing plants for packaging and shipment to all of America. One main point of pride within the community is the "Alabama Wild Shrimp Program".  Because wild shrimp caught by the local fleet must compete with farmed shrimp from overseas, economic pressures have driven many, multi-generational shimpers out of the business. As a result, the local shimpers, along with shrimpers out of the Mobile area have formed an alliance, increased their marketing, public relations knowledge and efforts to brand Alabama, Wild Caught Shrimp. Their efforts have paid off. Marine science has indeed proven that wild-caught shrimp from local waters are in fact less likely to contain contaminates than the farm-raised shrimp that have been imported from other countries. Still, the commercial shrimping industry in Bon Secour is hanging on by a very thin line.

Bon Secour is characterized by a coastal, Southern Gothic scenery with huge water oak trees covered in Spanish moss, great blue herons, brown pelicans, ever present bottle-nosed dolphin pods and the potent smell of salty gulf waters everywhere. The local commercial fisherman that make their living from the Gulf are no less salty but also friendly. Other than the relatively small, family owned, seafood processing plants, Bon Secour is primarily made up of many rural neighborhoods, most of which enjoy beautiful vistas of the Bon Secour River and Bon Secour Bay. Brown Pelicans are everywhere and locals often see alligators from time to time, plying the waters of the estuarial system from the head waters of the Bon Secour River to the bay. One can see baby bottle-nosed dolphins playing near the mouth of the river at any time. In Bon Secour one can catch bass, bream, fresh-water catfish, then travel a few miles down river, to the bay and catch all manner of salt water fish, shrimp, and oysters in the same day.

Homes in the Bon Secour area are some of the oldest along the eastern Alabama Gulf Coast. With the arrival of the current development boom, post Hurricane Ivan, property/houses in the area range anywhere from US$100,000 dollars for an older, inland house, to over several million dollars for a brand new mansion on the Bon Secour River banks or Bon Secour Bay. New, affluent, gated communities are growing. Those with the financial resources can purchase pristine, unadulterated land with million-dollar views of a wonderful ecosystem, complete with access to Mobile Bay, the Intracoastal Waterway, and the maritime travel opportunities that such waterways provide. All that is needed is a yacht and the means to travel anywhere the Intracoastal waterway extends. One can go from their own dock in Bon Secour, Alabama to Ft. Lauderdale, Florida by water. Boaters can circumnavigate the island or even pursue a trans-Gulf crossing, with a big enough vessel and enough seamanship experience for the voyage. Some local vessels have been known to travel from the Alabama Gulf Coast, across the Gulf of Mexico and Bay of Campeche to Cozumel (Mexico), Playa del Carmen, Cancún, etc.

Many seabirds, tree frogs and other natural fauna still live in the area of the pristine environment that is Bon Secour.

Hurricanes 
The location of Bon Secour on the northern coast of the Gulf of Mexico makes it especially vulnerable to hurricanes:

 In September 1979, Bon Secour received the full brunt of Category 3 Hurricane Frederic, which leveled most of the beachfront of the town.
 In September 2004, category 3 Hurricane Ivan made landfall only a few miles from Bon Secour, causing extensive wind and flooding damage. Nearby Orange Beach suffered even greater damage from its location east of Ivan's eyewall. Over 800 homes (mainly condominiums) were destroyed by Ivan.
 Hurricane Katrina (August 29, 2005) flooded Bon Secour with a large storm surge, which had extended over  eastward from the eye, also flooding the Florida Panhandle (such as Navarre Beach).  Waves near Bon Secour were 22-feet (6.7 m) high, in Mobile Bay.

2010 Gulf Oil Spill 
The 2010 Deepwater Horizon oil spill drastically reduced the availability of Gulf shrimp, so many people lost their jobs with the fishing industry. In June 2010, oil globs and submerged oil began washing ashore on the beaches of the Bon Secour National Wildlife Refuge, killing many fish and crabs.

Nearby towns

Geography
Bon Secour is located at 30°27'56" North, 87°45'13" West (30.465497, -087.753507).

The town has a total area of 3.4 square miles (8.7 km2), all land, although it lies along the Bon Secour River and bay.

Demographics

The estimated population of the town in 2010 is 743, pending the updated population counts from the 2010 U.S. Census. As of the census of 2000, there were 302 people living in the 36511 zip code. The racial makeup of the zip code area was 96.4% White, 1.7% Native American, 0.3% from other races, and 1.7% from two or more races. 1% of the population were Hispanic or Latino of any race.

The median age was 37.0 years. For every 100 females, there were 88.8 males.

Education 
Bon Secour is served by the Baldwin County Public Schools system, in the nearby town of Foley.
An elementary school, an intermediate school, a middle school, and a high school serve Foley.
 Foley High School (grades 9-12)
 Foley Intermediate School (grades 5-6)
 Foley Middle School (grades 7-8)
 Foley Elementary School (grades K-4)
 Swift Elementary School (grades PreK-6) - Located in Bon Secour.

Climate
Bon Secour enjoys a very mild climate throughout the year. High temperatures in the winter average around 65 degrees; summer-time high temperatures average around 87. Bon Secour also averages  of rainfall per year.

Regional
The Bon Secour National Wildlife Refuge (NWR) is not really located in Bon Secour, but nearby, along Ft. Morgan Road, on the island, over the Intracoastal Waterway bridge. The refuge was established by the United States Congress in 1980 to provide habitat for non-game birds migrating south in the fall and north in the spring. The migration paths from Bon Secour lead south to lower Florida, the Caribbean, Mexico and Central America. The Bon Secour refuge also serves as one of the largest undeveloped parcels of land on the Alabama coast, with sand dunes which are a reminder of the Gulf Coast, as it formerly existed. Consequently, the Bon Secour National Wildlife Refuge has been named among the ten natural wonders of Alabama. It has become a birding Mecca.

Notes

References
The following are reference sources, repeated alphabetically:
 FWS, "Bon Secour National Wildlife Refuge" (2006-08-18), US Fish and Wildlife Service, web: FWS-Gov-BSNWR.
 BrainyZip, "36511 zip code - Bon Secour" (2006), BrainyZip.com, web: BrainZip-36511.

Unincorporated communities in Baldwin County, Alabama
Unincorporated communities in Alabama
French-American culture in Alabama